Singin' Spurs is a 1948 American Western musical film directed by Ray Nazarro and written by Barry Shipman. The film stars Kirby Grant, Patricia Barry, Lee Patrick, Jay Silverheels, Dick Elliott and William Wilkerson. The film was released on September 23, 1948, by Columbia Pictures.

Plot

Cast          
Kirby Grant as Jeff Carter
Patricia Barry as Joan Dennis 
Lee Patrick as Clarissa Bloomsbury
Jay Silverheels as Abel
Dick Elliott as Mr. Miggs
William Wilkerson as Chief Wolfpack
Fred F. Sears as Mr. Hanson
Chester Clute as Mr. Totter
Paul Trietsch as Hezzie
Ken Trietsch as Ken 
Gil Taylor as Gil 
Charles Ward as Gabe 
Marion Colby as Singer 
Red Egner as Singer 
Billy Hill as Singer

References

External links
 

1948 films
1940s English-language films
American Western (genre) musical films
1940s Western (genre) musical films
Columbia Pictures films
Films directed by Ray Nazarro
American black-and-white films
1940s American films